The Europe Zone was one of the three regional zones of the 1956 Davis Cup.

24 teams entered the Europe Zone, with the winner going on to compete in the Inter-Zonal Zone against the winners of the America Zone and Eastern Zone. Italy defeated Sweden in the final and progressed to the Inter-Zonal Zone.

Draw

First round

Poland vs. Austria

Czechoslovakia vs. Pakistan

Luxembourg vs. Switzerland

Ireland vs. Finland

Turkey vs. Netherlands

Yugoslavia vs. Egypt

Monaco vs. Spain

Norway vs. Israel

Second round

Poland vs. Italy

Czechoslovakia vs. Denmark

Switzerland vs. France

Ireland vs. West Germany

Netherlands vs. Chile

Yugoslavia vs. Great Britain

Spain vs. Belgium

Norway vs. Sweden

Quarterfinals

Italy vs. Denmark

West Germany vs. France

Great Britain vs. Chile

Belgium vs. Sweden

Semifinals

France vs. Italy

Sweden vs. Great Britain

Final

Sweden vs. Italy

References

External links
Davis Cup official website

Davis Cup Europe/Africa Zone
Europe Zone
Davis Cup